James Bentley (9 March 1937 – 26 December 2000) was an English author and former Anglican parish priest.

Bentley was born in Bolton, Lancashire, England in 1937. He was educated at Bolton School before going up to Merton College, Oxford to read History in 1956. He worked as an Anglican parish priest and a research fellow at the University of Sussex before becoming a full-time freelance author and journalist in 1982.  In 1961 he married Audrey Winifred Darlington; they had two daughters.

He lived for many years in the Dordogne region of France, on which he became an expert, writing a guidebook and gazeteer which contained scholarly essays on the troubadours of the region, its prehistoric cave art and its cuisine. His separate book on the food of the region remains an excellent guide and the recipes he proposes are reliable.

Bentley died in hospital in Saumur, France in December 2000 after suffering extensive injuries in a collision near his home.

Works
 Ritualism and Politics in Victorian Britain
 Martin Niemoller
 Oberammergau and the Passion Play
 Secrets of Mount Sinai
 Restless Bones: The Story of Relics, Constable, London, 1985 
 A guide to the Dordogne, Viking, London, 1985, 
 Life and Food in the Dordogne, New Amsterdam Books, New York, 1986 
 Albert Schweitzer: The Enigma, HarperCollins, 1992

References

External links
 Obituary Rev James Bentley - The Independent

1937 births
2000 deaths
20th-century English Anglican priests
20th-century English historians
Alumni of Merton College, Oxford
English biographers
English male non-fiction writers
20th-century English male writers